German submarine U-483 was a Type VIIC U-boat of Nazi Germany's Kriegsmarine during World War II.

She carried out two patrols. She caused one warship to be declared a total loss.

She surrendered on 9 May 1945; she was sunk as part of Operation Deadlight on 16 December 1945.

Design
German Type VIIC submarines were preceded by the shorter Type VIIB submarines. U-483 had a displacement of  when at the surface and  while submerged. She had two shafts and two  propellers.

U-483 was fitted with five  torpedo tubes (four fitted at the bow and one at the stern), fourteen torpedoes, one  SK C/35 naval gun, (220 rounds), one  Flak M42 and two twin  C/30 anti-aircraft guns. The boat had a complement of between forty-four and sixty.

Service history
The submarine was laid down on 20 March 1943 at Deutsche Werke in Kiel as yard number 318, launched on 30 October and commissioned on 22 December under the command of Kapitänleutnant Hans-Joachim von Morstein.

She served with the 5th U-boat Flotilla from 22 December 1943 for training and the 3rd flotilla from 1 August 1944 for operations. She was reassigned to the 11th flotilla on 5 September.

First patrol
U-432s first patrol was preceded by short journeys from Kiel in Germany to Horten Naval Base (south of Oslo) and then Stavanger, both in Norway. The patrol itself began when the boat departed Stavanger on 3 October 1944. A Schnorchel [an underwater engine-functioning and breathing device], failure northwest of Scotland on the 12th resulted in the death of one man.

The bows were blown off the US-built ship. The commander, all the other officers and 84 ratings died, but the ship did not sink. The fires were put out and the flooding was stopped. She was eventually towed to Londonderry Port, then Belfast, but she was declared a total loss.

Second patrol
By now based at Bergen, the boat left there for her second foray on 7 February 1945. According to one source, she managed to enter the Irish Sea. She docked at Trondheim on 26 March.

Fate
U-483 surrendered in Trondheim on 9 May 1945. She was transferred to Scapa Flow then Loch Ryan in Scotland on 29 May for Operation Deadlight. She was sunk on 16 December by causes unknown.

Summary of raiding history

References

Notes

Citations

Bibliography

External links

German Type VIIC submarines
U-boats commissioned in 1943
U-boats sunk in 1945
1943 ships
Ships built in Kiel
Operation Deadlight
World War II submarines of Germany
Maritime incidents in December 1945